Westland New Post (WNP) was a short-lived Belgian extreme right-wing organization founded in March 1981 by Paul Latinus and members of the Front de la Jeunesse (FJ). The organization ceased to exist after the Front de la Jeunesse disbanded in 1983 and Paul Latinus was found dead in his girlfriend's home in April 1984.

Pastorale murders
Marcel Barbier, a WNP member, was convicted in May 1987 for a gruesome double murder at a synagogue on the la rue de la Pastorale in Anderlecht on February 18, 1982. One of the victims, Alphonse Vandermeulen, had been married to Barbier's current girlfriend, Marcelle Gobert. The police interrogated Barbier and his girlfriend, and searched both their homes, but no arrests were made. The police investigation into the murders was without success until August 16, 1983, when a violent incident occurred at Barbier's home in Saint-Gilles. Barbier was arrested, and when the police searched his home they found confidential NATO material, various weapons and neo-Nazi material. It also turned out that Barbier was a former member of the Front de la Jeunesse, and was currently a member of a neo-Nazi organization called Chevalerie teutonique. Barbier was convicted and jailed for this violent incident, but the investigation into the Pastorale murders continued.

During the interrogation of Barbier, the police found out about Westland New Post, although it was later revealed this organization was already known to the Belgian State Security Service, with an agent (albeit on his own initiative) already infiltrating the organization at the end of 1981, but the intelligence service did not communicate what it knew to the police or judiciary services. The police then investigated the WNP members to find out whether it was a private militia. Paul Latinus told the police that Barbier and another WNP member were behind the murders. Latinus had helped Barbier getting rid of the murder weapon and other relevant evidence. Barbier was the only person convicted for this murder, although other WNP members were suspect. In 1989, WNP member Christian Elnikoff claimed that he had committed the crime on Latinus' orders and that Marcel had made a false confession, also under Latinus' orders.

NATO documents
During the investigation of the incident at Barbier's home, the police found confidential NATO documents. Barbier told the police they were not his, but the possession of another WNP member, Michel Libert. Michel Libert worked as a military volunteer at the NATO Transmission Centre in Evere. Latinus, leader of WNP, was interrogated multiple times by the police and would confess to the stealing of confidential NATO documents. Security at the Centre was not high, and Libert delivered the documents to Latinus, who later published some of the material in the two editions of the WNP Althing magazine, which was delivered to, among others, military personnel. Latinus told the police that this was on behalf of his 'American superiors', to wake up the military command at NATO that leaks were happening, with only material on the Soviet Union being published in the Althing. Later it turned out more WNP members worked at the NATO Transmission Centre, and would deliver material, via Libert, to Latinus.

Brabant killers
In October 2014, the Belgian police apprehended Michel Libert, the former no. 2 of the organization. He was interrogated as a suspect in the Brabant killers case and his house was searched. The Belgian public television station RTBF alleged that Westland New Post had performed reconnaissance actions on the stores that later would be attacked by the Brabant killers. M. Libert had previously been interviewed several times as a witness. He left the court as a free man. The search of his house did not reveal anything that pointed to a possible connection with the Brabant Killers.

WNP and the Belgian State Security Service
Westland New Post was infiltrated by an agent of the Belgian State Security Service, Christian Smets. Smets already knew Paul Latinus, and Latinus previously worked as informant about the "extreme left" for the State Security. He was also an agent for some American intelligence service. Latinus himself tried to become an agent of the State Security, successfully passing the first exam, but he flew to Chile in January 1981 when the magazine Pour published an article in which he was depicted as an "extreme-rightist" infiltrating "extreme left" organizations. Latinus returned to Belgium somewhat later, and founded WNP with Marcel Barbier and Michel Libert.

In the organizational structure of WNP, Christian Smets was responsible for operational details, and taught the members about surveillance and intelligence gathering. One exercise of Smets supposedly took place just before the Pastorale murders, where members of WNP were given the task to shadow what later turned out to be one of the murder victims. Smets himself in later parliamentary testimony denied this proposition by former WNP members, but admitted giving intelligence exercises.

The last contacts between Smets and WNP occurred in June 1982, when Smets was transferred to the sector Brussels of the Secret Services, becoming responsible for VIP protection. Latinus at this time would stop being an informant for State Security, but Michel Libert would continue his relationship. According to Libert, Smets wrote an article in the anti-communist Nouvel Europe Magazine in March 1983, on the topic of "State Security prepares an extreme-right coup d'état?" Shortly after the Barbier incident Libert's relations to State Security would be severed, and the responsible group of State Security would be put off the WNP case.

Latinus suicide
The Belgian police found the dead body of Paul Latinus in the evening of April 24, 1984, at the home of his girlfriend in Court-Saint-Étienne, after her notification. The police found him lying on the floor of a basement, with strangulation marks around his neck, but no other signs of violence or disorder. They found a telephone cord that was cut. The girlfriend explained to the police that she found him when she came home from a bar, and that she cut the line between Latinus' head and the ceiling.

The body would be removed for burial, but the next day a judge ordered a house search. The girlfriend was again interrogated, and told the police that Latinus had a file Pinon, that had information on certain 'partouzes' of high-placed functionaries, involving minors. She said she had burned the file, after having shown it to an acquaintance. An autopsy was made that same day on the body of Latinus. The acquaintance that might have more information on the case was later found to have moved to Spain, before the Latinus suicide, but he was not further interrogated.

During the investigation into the death of Latinus, several WNP members would find it hard to believe that Latinus committed suicide, because he never gave a hint in that direction and had no reason to commit such an act. They found it more plausible that it was in fact a camouflaged murder, because he had a lot of compromising information on other people. Forensic tests were carried out in the basement in the winter of 1985, to check against the weight of Latinus, to see if the cord was not supposed to snap. Nothing conclusive came from this though, and an analysis of a certain quick strangulation method was also not found to be in agreement with the marks on Latinus's neck. The investigative team found no reason to continue the investigation, and thus the case Latinus was closed in the autumn of 1986. The remains of Latinus were exhumed in 1998, when the investigative team of the Brabant Killers, the cell-Jumet, tried to find out if the DNA of Latinus could be brought into connection with the Brabant massacre, but no positive results were found.

See also
 Communist Combatant Cells
 Brabant Killers

References

Literature
 René HAQUIN, Des taupes dans l'extrême droite - La Sûreté de l'Etat et le WNP, avec une postface de Walter de Bock, EPO, Anvers-Bruxelles, 1985.
 Hugo GIJSELS, L’enquête – Vingt années de déstabilisation en Belgique, éditions de la Longue Vue, Bruxelles, traduit du néerlandais, 1990.
 Philippe BREWAEYS & Jean-Frédérick DELIÈGE, de Bonvoisin et Cie - De Liège à Bruxelles, les prédateurs et l’Etat, éditions EPO, Anvers-Bruxelles, 1992.
 Christian CARPENTIER & Frederic MOSER, La Sûreté de l'Etat - Histoire d'une déstabilisation, Quorum, Gerpinnes, 1993.
 Victor MASSART, Les dés étaient pipés - Conspirations à la Sûreté de l'Etat, Quorum, Ottignies LLN, 1997.
 Claude MONIQUET, Les Dossiers noirs de la Belgique, éditions Michel Lafon, Neuilly-sur-Seine, 1999.
 Dirk BARREZ, Le pays des 1000 scandales - Un quart de siècle d'affaires en Belgique, Quorum, Gerpinnnes, 1998.

Paramilitary organisations based in Belgium
Neo-Nazi organizations
Neo-Nazism in Belgium